Black Widow is a 2010 thriller film directed by Mark Roemmich and starring Jack Scalia, Jennifer O'Dell, and Christopher McDonald.

Premise 
Sean McMurphy, a wealthy entrepreneur, meets a very beautiful woman and a passionate love affair ignites but soon it unfolds into a dark suspense/thriller where everyone around him is seduced into her dark web of lies, torture and deceit.

Reception 
The film received mixed to positive reception from critics. Roger Ebert gave it 3/4 stars.

External links
 

American thriller films
2010 thriller films
2010 films
2010s English-language films
2010s American films